Kandhampalayam is a Panchayat in the paramathi Velur Taluk of  Namakkal District, in the state of Tamil Nadu in India.

Location
Kandampalayam is in south India in the state of Tamil Nadu, approximately 14 km from the town Tiruchengode. It is located in State Highway SH-86.

Agriculture 
The main crops cultivated here are Peanut, Sorghum(Cholam) Coconut, yam, and tomato.

Including Panchayat areas
Kandampalayam is part of two panchayats Nallur and Maniyanoor.

Occupation and business
Even though Agriculture is main livelihood here, few industries(iron, steel and weaving) creates job for surrounding villages. Business like Borewells shine in these areas.

Education
Below are the Higher secondary Schools in kandampalayam.

 # SKV Matriculation Hr Sec School
 # Gandhi Matriculation Hr Sec School
 # Government Hr Sec School

Cities and towns in Namakkal district